Charles Petrie may refer to:

 Sir Charles Petrie, 1st Baronet (1853–1920), Scottish businessman and Lord Mayor of Liverpool
 Sir Charles Petrie, 3rd Baronet (1895–1977), British historian
 Charles Petrie (diplomat) (born 1959), British United Nations official, Executive Representative for Burundi
 Charles Robert Petrie (1882–1958), New Zealand politician of the Labour Party
 Charlie Petrie (born 1895), English footballer in the 1920s